Thomas Kevin Barker (born March 11, 1955) is an American former professional basketball player. He played collegiately for the Minnesota Golden Gophers, College of Southern Idaho Golden Eagles and the Hawaii Rainbow Warriors. Barker was selected by the Atlanta Hawks as the 53rd overall pick in the 1976 NBA Draft. He played for the Hawks, Houston Rockets, Boston Celtics, New York Knicks in the National Basketball Association (NBA).

External links 
 

1955 births
Living people
American expatriate basketball people in Italy
American expatriate basketball people in the Netherlands
Atlanta Hawks draft picks
Atlanta Hawks players
Basketball players from Texas
Boston Celtics players
Heroes Den Bosch players
Hawaii Rainbow Warriors basketball players
Houston Rockets players
Jersey Shore Bullets players
Minnesota Golden Gophers men's basketball players
New York Knicks players
People from Harlingen, Texas
Southern Idaho Golden Eagles men's basketball players
American men's basketball players
Centers (basketball)
Power forwards (basketball)